Alison L. Booth is an Australian labour economist and novelist who is professor of economics at the Australian National University. She is the author of six novels. These are Stillwater Creek (2010), The Indigo Sky (2011), A Distant Land (2012), A Perfect Marriage (2018), The Philosopher's Daughters (2020) and The Painting (2021).

Early life and education
Booth was born in Melbourne and grew up in Sydney. Her father, Norman Booth, wrote an Australian war novel called Up The Dusty Track.

Booth has both a Masters of Economics and a PhD from the London School of Economics. Her dissertation under Tony Atkinson was on the microeconomic behaviour of trade unions and membership.

Career
Booth's research interests cover labour economics, behavioural economics, and the economics of gender. She lectured at the University of Bristol in the 1980s and was Professor of Economics the University of Essex from 1995 to 2013. She was editor-in-chief of Labour Economics from 1999–2004 and President of the European Association of Labour Economists from 2006–2008. In 2017, Booth received the Distinguished Fellow Award of the Economic Society of Australia,  and in 2019 she was elected as fellow of the Econometric Society. She has also spent time on the  Council of the European Society of Population Economists. She has worked in the areas of gender and discrimination in the labour force. Her research found that girls at single-sex schools are less risk averse than those at co-ed schools, perhaps due to the absence of "culturally driven norms and beliefs about the appropriate mode of female behaviour" and that women take more career risks when they are supported by other women. Her research has also  investigated how competitive behaviour in China was affected by the Cultural Revolution and  she has used field data to study the impact of culture on male and female competitive behaviour in Japan and in South Korea. Booth has also called for blind recruiting due to her research into discrimination in callback rates for applicants with non-Anglo-Saxon sounding names.

Fiction
Booth has also published short stories and six novels.

The first book in Booth's trilogy, Stillwater Creek (2010), "captures a particular time in Australian history – memories of the war are still relatively fresh, communism is the new fear, and social mores are still very conservative”. In an interview, Booth said about the town of Jingera, “I like to think of [it] as... a stage on which a few actors play out the universal stories. Translated into French (Les Rivages du Souvenir) by Helene Collon for publication by Presses de la Cite in 2011, the novel was Highly Commended in the 2011 ACT Book of the Year Award, and was published as a Select Edition in 2011 by Reader's Digest in Australasia and in the UK.

Booth's second novel, The Indigo Sky (2011), is set in late 1961. Booth  "uses Jingera as a microcosm for the social and political issues faced by post-war Australia. [She]... weaves the gritty issues of paedophilia, racism and postwar trauma into her first book, and the removal of Aboriginal children and bullying into her second book, but manages to maintain a light and hopeful tone”. The final book in the trilogy, A Distant Land (2012), is set in Jingera, Sydney and Cambodia in 1971. It focuses on "Human rights, civil liberties and war”.
 
Booth's fourth novel, A Perfect Marriage (2018), is a "cleverly structured" story of middle-class "domestic violence" and its long term effects.

The fifth novel, The Philosopher's Daughters, was published in the UK on 2 April 2020. The novel explores race and gender in 19th-century Australia, and has been described as "wonderfully evocative".

Booth's sixth novel, The Painting, was published in the UK in July 2021.  It "deftly explores the migration experience", and its author is described as "an elegant writer who excels at inhabiting the intellectual headspace of her characters".

Personal life
Booth is married and has two daughters.

Select bibliography

Books

Articles
 
 
 
 
 
 
 
 
 
 
 
 
Booth, Alison; Fan, Elliott; Zhang, Dandan; Xin, Meng (2019). "Gender Differences in Willingness to Compete: The Role of Culture and Institutions". The Economic Journal, 129: 734–764, https://doi.org/10.1111/ecoj.12583

Novels
 
 
 
 
Booth, Alison (2020). The Philosopher's Daughters. RedDoor Press. 
Booth, Alison (2021). The Painting. RedDoor Press. ISBN 9781913062651.

References

External links
 ANU Profile
 Website
http://legacy/iza.org/en/webcontent/personnel/vitae/booth.cv.pdf

Living people
Australian women novelists
21st-century Australian novelists
21st-century Australian women writers
Australian women economists
Academic staff of the Australian National University
Alumni of the London School of Economics
Education economists
Labor economists
Year of birth missing (living people)
Australian expatriates in the United Kingdom
Writers from Sydney
Writers from Melbourne
Fellows of the Academy of the Social Sciences in Australia
Fellows of the Econometric Society